Khumeh Zar (also Romanized as Khūmeh Zār) is a city in the Central District of Mamasani County, Fars Province, Iran.  At the 2006 census, its population was 5,643, in 1,283 families - but it was counted as Khumeh Zar-e Sofla ("Lower Khumeh Zar") with 5,550 people in 1,262, separate from Khumeh Zar-e Olya ("Upper Khumeh Zar") with 93 people in 21 families.

References

Populated places in Mamasani County

Cities in Fars Province